2016 World Championship may refer to:

 2016 FINA World Swimming Championships (25 m)
 2016 IAAF World Indoor Championships
 2016 Men's Bandy World Championship
 2016 Women's Bandy World Championship
 2016 Men's World Open Squash Championship
 2016 Women's World Team Squash Championships
 2016 World Indoor Bowls Championship
 2016 World Rowing Championships

 Cycling

 2016 UCI BMX World Championships
 2016 UCI Cyclo-cross World Championships
 2016 UCI Road World Championships
 2016 UCI Track Cycling World Championships

 Motorsports

 2016 FIA Formula One World Championship
 2016 FIA World Endurance Championship
 2016 FIA World Rally Championship
 2016 FIA World Rallycross Championship
 2016 FIA World Touring Car Championship
 2016 F1 Powerboat World Championship
 2016 Red Bull Air Race World Championship

 Winter sports

 2016 World Ringette Championships
 2016 Biathlon World Championship
 2016 FIBT Bobsleigh and Skeleton World Championships
 2016 FIL World Luge Championships
 2016 World Men's Curling Championship
 2016 World Women's Curling Championship
 2016 Men's World Ice Hockey Championships
 2016 Women's Ice Hockey World Championships
 2016 World Allround Speed Skating Championships
 2016 World Figure Skating Championships
 2016 World Short Track Speed Skating Championships
 2016 World Single Distance Speed Skating Championships
 2016 World Sprint Speed Skating Championships

See also
 2016 World Cup (disambiguation)